Langwasser is a part (Stadtteil) of Nuremberg in the southeastern area of the city. It was developed as a prototype of the satellite town concept in the 1960s and is primarily a suburban residential area. The name Langwasser (translation: 'long water'), comes from a small stream bordering the area on its eastern edge.

Location
Langwasser is located in the southeastern area of Nuremberg and is part of the statistical area Südöstliche Außenstadt.

History

At the beginning of the 20th century, the area that would become Langwasser was heavily wooded and part of the forest and former imperial estate,  (in English usage, 'Nuremberg Reichswald'). After devastating forest fires between 1917 and 1919 the area was cleared and used for farming.

Nazi era

Prior to World War II, the area which had been cleared by fire became an important site for the Nazi movement. Beginning in 1934 it was the site of various tent cities and encampments. The area originally housed a tent encampment of the Reich Labor Service (RAD) and later the Hitler Youth (HJ). Permanent camps for the SS, SA, HJ, and RAD were built near the Nuremberg Rally Grounds. The Langwasser camp, with space for 200,000, was the largest. At the outbreak of World War II, party rallies ceased and the compound was converted into a prisoner-of-war camp known as Stalag XIII-D, which housed up to 150,000 prisoners until closing in 1940. In this camp during August 1940, prisoners of war celebrated a "special Olympics" called International Prisoner-of-War Olympic Games where prisoners of Belgium, France, Great Britain, Norway, Poland, Russia and Yugoslavia took part. United States military records report that 6,676 American POWs were transferred there late in the war.

Post-war period

The history of Langwasser as a district begins after the Second World War in 1949. For ten years the area was a mixture of refugee camps and temporary housing developments. Construction of the first permanent housing developments did not begin until the 1950s. Many German refugees from Silesia and from the Sudetenland made Langwasser their new home.

The facilities were used as internment camp by the US occupation army. During the Nuremberg trials 21 witnesses - members of the SS - were moved from the Palace of Justice to the camp on July 17, 1946.

Modern times

The modern history of Langwasser begins with the decision of the city of Nuremberg to develop a planned community in the area marketed with the slogan "living in the country". An architectural competition was held in 1956, with construction beginning the following year. Construction was not fully completed until the 1990s.

A part of Langwasser Nordost around Euckenweg is apparently car free, although with underground garages.

Public Transportation

Langwasser is served by the Nuremberg U-Bahn (subway or underground train) on the U1 line. The line terminal, Langwasser Süd, is one of five different U1 stations in Langwasser. Bus services act as an alternative form of public transportation, and are available at several stops in the area.

Notes 
This article was created as a student project as part of the Lexicon Franconian Translation Project.

References 

Districts of Nuremberg